Pekin is an unincorporated community and census-designated place (CDP) in Carroll County, Ohio, United States. It was first listed as a CDP prior to the 2020 census.

The CDP is on the northern edge of Carroll County, in northeastern Brown Township. It is bordered to the east by the village of Minerva and to the north by Paris Township in Stark County. Ohio State Route 183 (Valley Street) passes through the southern part of the CDP, leading northeast into Minerva and southwest  to Malvern.

Pekin is on the north side of Sandy Creek, a southwest-flowing tributary of the Tuscarawas River, part of the Ohio River watershed.

Demographics

References 

Census-designated places in Carroll County, Ohio
Census-designated places in Ohio